Efraín Álvarez (born 19 June 2002) is a professional footballer who plays as an attacking midfielder for Major League Soccer club LA Galaxy. Born in the United States, he represents the Mexico national team. He was included in The Guardian's "Next Generation 2019".

Club career

LA Galaxy II
Born in Los Angeles, California, Álvarez signed with LA Galaxy II of the United Soccer League on August 2, 2017. In signing with the side, Álvarez became the youngest signing in USL history, ahead of the previous holder Alphonso Davies, at 15 years, one month, and 14 days. Álvarez made his professional debut for LA Galaxy II on October 7, against Portland Timbers 2, he came on as a 46th-minute substitute for Adrian Vera as LA Galaxy II won 3–2. In playing, Álvarez became the youngest player to ever play a USL match. 
Álvarez was moved to parent club LA Galaxy ahead of their 2018 season, but was loaned back to the reserve team.

LA Galaxy
Álvarez made his senior team debut on March 2, 2019, and assisted on a goal during a 2–1 victory over the Chicago Fire. On September 2, 2020 Álvarez scored his first MLS goal against the Portland Timbers, the first in a 3–2 win.

International career
Álvarez was eligible to play for the United States or Mexico, having been born in the United States to Mexican parents. He currently represents Mexico at the senior level after playing for the United States at the U-15 youth level, and once stated, "I'm not closing the door on anyone. I could still play for the U.S. or I could keep playing for Mexico. But I'm with Mexico right now and that's my focus."

Álvarez originally represented the United States U15's. In April 2016, he served as their captain at the 2016 International Festival of Fútbol in Rosario, Argentina, starting all three matches and leading the United States to the title. In the opening match against Talleres de Córdoba, Álvarez scored three goals and assisted two more goals in a 5–1 victory. He also scored against Uruguay U15s in a 2–0 win. In June 2016, Álvarez was again called to the United States U15s, for a four-team tournament in Zagreb, Croatia in which he made one start against Croatia U15s.

Álvarez began playing for Mexico U15's in September 2016. He scored a brace for them in a friendly 7–0 win over the Cayman Islands U17 on August 11, 2017. He also represented the Mexico U15s in their championship-winning run at the 2017 CONCACAF Boys' Under-15 Championship, and provided the game-winning assist against his previous team, the United States U15s.

Álvarez debuted for the Mexico U17's team in a 1–0 win over the Argentina U17's, and scored the only goal in the match. He was included in the roster that would participate at the 2019 U-17 World Cup. He scored four goals in the tournament, scoring the winning goal from a free-kick in the semi-final against the Netherlands as Mexico finished runner-up against Brazil.

In November 2020, Álvarez was called-up to the United States national team for a friendly match in Fort Lauderdale against El Salvador. However, he did not receive any playing minutes in that match due to not having yet filed a one-time switch to FIFA in order to officially play for the United States.

In March 2021, Álvarez was called-up to the Mexico national team for friendly matches against Wales and Costa Rica. On March 30, he made his debut with the national team against Costa Rica, coming on as a substitute for Jesús Manuel Corona during the second half for a 1–0 victory.

In June 2021, Álvarez confirmed his commitment to Mexico over overtures to play for the United States. A few days later, he replaced the injured Rodolfo Pizarro on the upcoming 2021 CONCACAF Gold Cup squad. On July 10, 2021, his appearance as a substitute against Trinidad and Tobago permanently cap-tied him to Mexico.

In May 2022, Álvarez was included in the under-21 roster that participated in the 2022 Maurice Revello Tournament, scoring two goals, Mexico finished third.

Personal life
Efraín is the younger brother of professional soccer player Carlos Alvarez.

Career statistics

Club

International

Honours
Mexico U17
CONCACAF U-17 Championship: 2019
FIFA U-17 World Cup runner-up: 2019

Individual
USL Championship Young Player of the Year: 2018

References

External links 
 LA Galaxy Profile.
 
 US Soccer Profile

2002 births
Living people
Soccer players from Los Angeles
Mexican footballers
Mexico international footballers
Mexico youth international footballers
American soccer players
United States men's youth international soccer players
American sportspeople of Mexican descent
Citizens of Mexico through descent
Association football midfielders
LA Galaxy II players
LA Galaxy players
USL Championship players
Major League Soccer players
Homegrown Players (MLS)
2021 CONCACAF Gold Cup players